The 2020–21 season was Nordsjælland's 24th season in existence as a football club, 17th under the current name, and 19th consecutive season in the Superliga, the top-flight of football in the country. In addition to the domestic league, the club also competed in this season's edition of the Danish Cup, losing out in the third round to second division side Hvidovre.

Players

Transfers

In

Out

Non-competitive friendlies

Pre-season

Mid-season

Competitions

Overview

Danish Superliga

Results by matchday

Regular season

Championship round

Matches

Regular season

Championship round

Danish Cup

Statistics

Goalscorers

Last updated: 10 May 2021

Clean sheets

Last updated: 10 May 2021

References

FC Nordsjælland seasons
Danish football clubs 2020–21 season